Amerila puella is a species of moth of the  subfamily Arctiinae. It is found in Senegal, Sierra Leone, Ivory Coast, Ghana, Nigeria, Zaire, Uganda, Ethiopia, Kenya, Tanzania and Malawi.

Subspecies
Amerila puella puella (Guinea, Principe Island)
Amerila puella carneola (Hampson, 1916) (Uganda, Tanzania, Malawi, Zaire and East Africa from Ethiopia to Uganda and Tanzania)
Amerila puella invidua (Bethune-Baker, 1925) (West Africa from Senegal to Ivory Coast)
Amerila puella rothi (Rothschild, 1910) (Ivory Coast, Nigeria, West Africa: southern Nigeria and Cameroon)

References

Moths described in 1793
Amerilini
Moths of Africa